Baumer Hall is one of the 31 residence halls at the University of Notre Dame. It located on West Quad, south of Keough Hall and west of Ryan Hall, on the McGlinn fields. It is the newest men's residence hall, built in 2019, after a donation from John and Mollie Baumer.

History 
The hall was constructed thanks to a $20 million donation from John and Mollie Baumer. it was built to alleviate overcrowding of the present halls and expand the capacity of the campus.  Born in South Bend, John Baumer is a 1990 Notre Dame finance graduate and lived in Zahm Hall, and later attended University of Pennsylvania's Wharton School.  Baumer's father, Fred Baumer, was comptroller for the University of Notre Dame for twenty-one years. Currently, a senior partner at private equity firm Leonard Green & Partners. Baumer made a gift in In 2015, he made a financial gift of $3 million to endow the coaching position for the Notre Dame Fighting Irish men's lacrosse. He is also a member of Notre Dame's Campaign Cabinet, the Wall Street Committee, and the university's President's Circle, Rite Aid Corp, Petco Animal Supplies, FTD Group and Equinox Fitness. Mollie Baumer attended Saint Mary's College and the couple lives in California.

Construction started November 2017 in and was completed August 2019. It was built to attain LEED silver certification. For the 2019–2020 school year, the Dillon Hall community lived in Baumer while Dillon was under renovation.

Baumer Hall opened as its own community in 2020, amidst the COVID-19 pandemic. Its first rector is Robert Lisowski, C.S.C., also known as "The Admiral". Lisowski, from Scranton, earned his undergraduate degree from St. John's University and entered the Congregation of Holy Cross in 2014, served as an assistant rector for Dillon Hall in 2019, and completed his Master of Divinity at Notre Dame in May 2020. He was ordained to the priesthood on April 10, 2021.

The dorm developed a rivalry with the nearby Duncan Hall. The dorm sponsored a plasma donation drive to benefit the South Bend Medical Foundation in its fight against COVID-19.

In January 2022, the hall received LEED gold certification.

Description 
The hall is four-stories high and 78,000-square-feet. It features a two-story common lounge, a reading room and communal kitchen, a chapel, a laundry room, a vending area, storage space, and a gym. The architecture of the hall reflects a modernist collegiate gothic style of the rest of the campus. The chapel, dedicated to St. Martin de Porres, was designed with clean gothic architecture and wood detailing.

Notes

External links 

 Baumer Hall on the Residential Life website
 Baumer Hall on the Notre Dame campus tour
 Article on the South Bend Tribune

2019 establishments in Indiana
University and college buildings completed in 2019
University of Notre Dame residence halls